Female Engagement Teams (FETs) are groups of female military personnel around the world which undertake specialized gender-suited tasks. FETs' tasks are as varied as American FETs interacting with local Afghan women in Afghanistan; Ghana Battalion FETs taking part in gathering intelligence during peacekeeping operations in the Democratic Republic of Congo; New Zealand Defence Force FETs support Special Operations Force objectives, the primary role being to "engage with local women and adolescents [...] in situations where it would be culturally unacceptable to involve male SOF operators", and the Jordanian Armed Forces FETs helping to conduct physical searches of women along the borders. However FETs also have had their fair share of limited success and problems in certain operations, with service personnel unable to interact successfully with the required population, lack of translators, too short a time frame or commanders refusing to take up FET missions.

Female Engagement Teams have their roots in American military operations in Iraq and Afghanistan, in the form of Team Lioness between 2003 and 2004. In 2009, the US Marine Corps attached FETs to infantry units. One of the first FET programs is with 3rd Battalion, 8th Marine Regiment, Farah Province, Afghanistan. The first permanent American FET arrived in Afghanistan (Regional Command Southwest) in March 2010 whereas the first British FET began in October 2010. Australia, United Kingdom and Canada also employed FETs in Afghanistan. Sweden used all-female as well as mixed-gender engagement teams.

References

Further reading

 The Veil of Kevlar: an Analysis of the Female Engagement Teams in Afghanistan
 Letting Women Reach Women in Afghan War. New York Times.

All-female military units and formations
Women in war